Marcos Túlio Valério (born 30 April 1992),  or simply Marcos Túlio, is a Brazilian professional footballer who plays as a central midfielder for Aparecidense.

External links

1992 births
Living people
Brazilian footballers
C.F. União players
Association football midfielders